Uchkhoz is a rural locality (a settlement) and the administrative center of Krepovskoye Rural Settlement, Uryupinsky District, Volgograd Oblast, Russia. The population was 665 as of 2010. There are 10 streets.

Geography 
Uchkhoz is located in steppe, 10 km northeast of Uryupinsk (the district's administrative centre) by road. Kreptovsky is the nearest rural locality.

References 

Rural localities in Uryupinsky District